Poisson number can refer to: 

 In mechanics, the reciprocal of Poisson's ratio. 1 / v.
 In statistics, a number drawn from a Poisson distribution